The dwarf koel (Microdynamis parva) is a species of cuckoo in the family Cuculidae. It is monotypic within the genus Microdynamis. It is found in New Guinea, where its natural habitat is subtropical or tropical moist lowland forests. Its closest relatives are the Eudynamys (the true koels).

References

dwarf koel
Birds of New Guinea
dwarf koel
Taxonomy articles created by Polbot